The 13th annual Berlin International Film Festival was held from 21 June to 2 July 1963. The Golden Bear was awarded ex aequo to the Italian film Il diavolo directed by Gian Luigi Polidoro and Japanese film Bushidô zankoku monogatari directed by Tadashi Imai.

Jury
The following people were announced as being on the jury for the festival:

International feature film jury
 Wendy Toye, actress and director (United Kingdom) - Jury President
 Harry R. Sokal, producer (West Germany)
 Fernando Ayala, director, screenwriter and producer (Argentina)
 Jean-Pierre Melville, director and screenwriter (France)
 Baldev Raj Chopra, director and producer (India)
 Guglielmo Biraghi, journalist and film critic (Italy)
 Masatora Sakurai (Japan)
 Karl Malden, actor (United States)
 Günther Engels (West Germany)

International documentary and short jury
 T.O.S. Benson, minister of culture (Nigeria) - Jury President
 Charles Boost, illustrator and writer (Netherlands)
 Volker Baer, journalist (West Germany)
 Carlos Fernández Cuenca, journalist and film critic (Spain)
 Børge Høst, director, screenwriter and producer (Denmark)
 Wolfgang Kiepenheuer, director and producer (West Germany)
 Abdel Rahim Sorour, (United Arab Emirates)

Films in competition
The following films were in competition for the Golden Bear award:

Key
{| class="wikitable" width="550" colspan="1"
| style="background:#FFDEAD;" align="center"| †
|Winner of the main award for best film in its section
|}

Awards
The following prizes were awarded by the Jury:

International jury awards
 Golden Bear: 
 Il diavolo by Gian Luigi Polidoro
 Bushidô zankoku monogatari by Tadashi Imai
 Silver Bear for Best Director: Nikos Koundouros for Mikres Aphrodites
 Silver Bear for Best Actress: Bibi Andersson for Älskarinnan
 Silver Bear for Best Actor: Sidney Poitier for Lilies of the Field
 Silver Bear Extraordinary Jury Prize: The Caretaker by Clive Donner

Documentaries and short films jury awards
 Silver Bear (Documentaries): Der große Atlantik by Peter Baylis
 Short Film Golden Bear: Bowspelement by Charles Huguenot van der Linden
 Silver Bear for Best Short Film: The Home-Made Car by James Hill
 Silver Bear Extraordinary Jury Prize (Short film): ex aequoTori by Errko KivikoskiShaqayeq-e Suzan by Hushang Shafti

Independent jury awards
FIPRESCI Award
Mikres Afrodites by Nikos Koundouros
Honorable Mention: 
La rimpatriata by Damiano Damiani
Interfilm Award
Lilies of the Field by Ralph Nelson
OCIC Award
Lilies of the Field by Ralph Nelson
UNICRIT Award
Los inocentes by Juan Antonio Bardem
Youth Film Award (Jugendfilmpreis):
Best Feature Film Suitable for Young People: ex aequo Ha-Martef by Natan Gross and Stop Train 349 by Rolf Hädrich
Honorable Mention: Lilies of the Field by Ralph Nelson
Best Short Film Suitable for Young People: Merci, Monsieur Schmitz by Alain Champeaux and Pierre Vetrine
Honorable Mention: The Home-Made Car by James Hill

References

External links
 13th Berlin International Film Festival 1963
1963 Berlin International Film Festival
Berlin International Film Festival:1963  at Internet Movie Database

13
1963 film festivals
1963 in West Germany
1960s in West Berlin